Culladiella acacia is a moth in the family Crambidae. It was described by Schouten in 1993. It is found in Kenya.

References

Crambinae
Moths described in 1993